Amy Lee (born May 30, 1989), known professionally as Ailee, is an American singer and songwriter based in South Korea. Amassing digital sales success in South Korea, she has released four studio albums, six extended plays, and twenty one singles, six of which charted within the top five of the Gaon Digital Chart.

Following a short stint at Muzo Entertainment in New York City, Ailee moved to South Korea in 2010 and signed with YMC Entertainment. She debuted in 2012 with her first single "Heaven", which peaked at number three on the Gaon Digital Chart and earned her Best New Artist Awards at the Melon Music Awards, Golden Disc Awards, Gaon Chart K-Pop Awards, and Seoul Music Awards. She won four consecutive Mnet Asian Music Award for Best Female Vocal Performance titles from 2013 to 2016, with "U&I", "Singing Got Better", "Mind Your Own Business", and "If You" respectively. Her 2017 single, "I Will Go to You Like the First Snow", recorded for the soundtrack of the television drama series Guardian: The Lonely and Great God (2016), won several awards and was the most digitally successful song of that year, becoming the best-selling record in movies and dramas in the Korean sound record market.

Life and career

1989–2011: Early life, career beginnings
Ailee was born in Denver, Colorado, on May 30, 1989, and grew up in New Jersey. She attended Palisades Park High School before moving to nearby Leonia. After her Scotch Plains-Fanwood High School graduation, she studied communications at Pace University before dropping out to pursue a career in music. Before her K-pop debut, Ailee was signed under Muzo Entertainment, an independent agency in New York City and New Jersey. Under that label she collaborated with several artists, including Johnnyphlo and Philadelphia-based rapper Decipher. Before moving to South Korea, Ailee created the YouTube channels "mzamyx3" and "aileemusic" to bring attention to her singing on the web.

Ailee moved to South Korea in 2010 after she landed a music label audition through her uncle's connections. She sang "Resignation" by Big Mama during the audition and was recruited for YMC Entertainment on the spot. During her training, YMC featured her in the label's Wheesung song, "They Are Coming", which it released in October 2011. She also sang in Decipher and Jay Park's song "Catch Me If You Can". In September 2011, Ailee and Wheesung were featured on the MBC's Chuseok special episode of Singer and Trainee. Ailee performed "Halo" by Beyoncé to a positive reaction from the audience. Following her performance of "Halo", judge BMK said, "Wherever she goes, she has the potential to be a big star. She definitely has the voice." After the judges had graded all the participants, Ailee was the first-place winner.

2012: Debut and commercial success

On February 9, 2012, Ailee released her debut single "Heaven" along with the music video, which featured Gi Kwang of Beast. On the same day, she made her debut stage performance of "Heaven" on M Countdown. Billboard commented, "From her debut single, Ailee proved that she had an ability beyond her years to communicate the deeper experiences one feels in love. In this dedication track, Ailee's partner protected her and taught her how to love in a harsh world." The success of the single, helped Ailee win her first award at the 2012 Cyworld Digital Music Awards. The single received the Song of the month (February) and Rookie of the month at the award ceremony.

On October 16, 2012, Ailee released her debut EP, Invitation, with the title track "I Will Show You". The EP contained a total of six tracks. It was produced by producers such as Kim Do-hoon, Lee Hyun-seung, Park Guen-tae, Duble Sidekick, Wheesung, and featured artists such as Verbal Jint, Swings and Simon Dominic.

In 2012, Ailee was awarded the Best New Artist Award at the Seoul Music Awards, Melon Music Awards, Mnet Asian Music Awards, and Golden Disk Awards, as well as the New Female Solo Artist Award at the Gaon Chart Music Awards. She has also received the Mnet America Rising Star Award, a special award presented by Mnet America at the pre-show of 55th Grammy Awards.

2013–2014: Commercial popularity

On July 12, 2013, Ailee released her second Ep, titled A's Doll House. The EP's title track, "U&I" topped various music charts within four hours of release.

On November 6, 2013, Ailee made her Japanese debut with Japanese-version of "Heaven" and "Starlight" under Warner Music Japan.

On January 6, 2014, Ailee released a single titled "Singing Got Better", produced by Wheesung. The song peaked at number one upon released on various music chart. The single has received the Best Vocal Performance at the 2014 Mnet Asian Music Awards.

On September 25, 2014, Ailee released her third EP, titled Magazine. The EP's title track, "Don't Touch Me" peaked at number one upon released on various music chart. The single received the Digital Bonsang at the 2015 Golden Disc Awards.

2015–2016: Breakthrough with Vivid
After wrapping up her joint Unite the Mic Tour with Jay Park and San E in Toronto in March 2015, plans were revealed for Ailee to hold a solo concert three years after her debut. Her first solo concert, titled Fatal Attraction, was held on July 4, 2015, at the Olympic Hall. Ailee was joined on stage several times by different artists who helped her sing her many duets and collaborations. She sang "Shut Up" with Showry, "Like Nobody Knows" and "Comma 07" with Cheetah, "Wash Away" and "Officially Missing You" with Geeks, "NimA" and "Shower of Tears" with Baechigi, and "Touch My Body" and "Let"s Go Travel" with Shin Bo-ra.

Ailee's first full-length album Vivid was released on September 30, 2015. She won her first trophy for this promotion on October 7, 2015, on Show Champion. Ailee was awarded the Best Female Vocal Award for the third consecutive year at the 2015 Mnet Asian Music Awards, for "Mind Your Own Business".

On July 13, 2016, Ailee was confirmed to participate as a judge on Superstar K 2016.

On August 23, 2016, Ailee released her single "If You", which subsequently topped the Gaon Weekly Chart for Digital Download.

On October 5, 2016, Ailee released her EP A New Empire, along with the music video for "Home" that was officially released on LOEN and YMC Entertainment's official YouTube channel. A New Empire peaked at number 10 on the Gaon Album Chart, and number nine on the US World Albums (Billboard) Chart.

On December 2, 2016, Ailee was again awarded with Best Vocal Performance at the 2016 Mnet Asian Music Awards, this time for "If You", a record-breaking fourth consecutive win in the category.

2017–2018: OST success and solo concert tours
On January 7, 2017, Ailee released her debut American single "Fall Back" through WestSide Entertainment under the alias A.Leean. She also released the ballad "I Will Go to You Like the First Snow" (첫눈처럼 너에게 가겠다) on the same day as part nine in a series composed of singles for the South Korean cable television series Guardian: The Lonely and Great God. The single topped the Gaon Digital Chart for three consecutive weeks. The single earned Ailee the Best OST Award at the 2017 Korea Cable TV Awards. The soundtrack has also received several accolades, including the best original soundtrack award at the Seoul International Drama Awards, the Mnet Asian Music Awards, the Melon Music Awards, the Seoul Music Awards and the Golden Disc Awards.

Ailee previously held two Christmas concerts in Seoul titled Welcome Home at Kyunghee University's Grand Peace Palace on December 24–25, 2016. Due to the success of the concerts, it was announced that Ailee would be holding her first nationwide tour, titled Welcome Home Tour, which started in Daegu on April 1, 2017. On June 25, 2017, in The City Hall at Taipei International Convention Center, Ailee held her first solo concert in Taiwan titled Ailee – Hello Taipei 2017. On November 18 and 19, Ailee held two concerts at the Pechanga Theater in California, selling out a total of 2,600 tickets combined.

On March 18, 2018, Ailee performed "I Will Show You" at the closing ceremony of the 2018 Paralympic Winter Games at the Pyeongchang Olympic Stadium. On September 14, 2018, Ailee was chosen as a member of the South Korean cultural delegation, alongside other selected South Korean artists, for the third inter-Korean summit in Pyongyang, North Korea, where she performed her OST "I Will Go to You Like the First Snow". On November 23, 2018, Ailee announced her second nationwide tour, titled I Am: Ailee.

2019–present: Butterfly, continued touring, I'm, Lovin, Amy and I'm Lovin' Amy
Ailee released her second studio album, titled Butterfly, on July 2, 2019, with the lead single "Room Shaker". On September 10, 2019, Ailee announced on Instagram that she started a new company named, "Rocket3 Entertainment" after being signed with YMC Entertainment for eight years.

On December 13, 2019, Ailee released her first English language single under American label, Sun and Sky Records. The single, entitled "Sweater", was hailed as "a heart-wrenching-yet-soothing ballad" by Billboard.

Ailee released her fifth extended play titled I'm on October 6, 2020, with the lead single "When We Were In Love". The music video was released on October 12, 2020, and was directed by Will Kim. On November 8, 2020, Ailee released "Blue Bird", an OST that would be part nine of singles for the South Korean drama Start-Up.

On May 7, 2021, Ailee released her sixth extended play titled Lovin', ahead of the release of her third studio album. The extended play includes two lead singles, "Make Up Your Mind" and "Spring Flowers".<ref>{{Cite web |author=Seon |first=Mi-kyung |date=April 19, 2021 |title= |script-title=ko:에일리, 5월 7일 선공개 앨범 'LOVIN 컴백..봄 감성[공식] |trans-title=Ailee, comeback of the pre-released album 'LOVIN' on May 7..Spring emotion [Official] |url=https://entertain.naver.com/read?oid=109&aid=0004390281 |url-status=live |archive-url=https://web.archive.org/web/20210419052802/https://entertain.naver.com/read?oid=109&aid=0004390281 |archive-date=April 19, 2021 |access-date=April 19, 2021 |publisher=Osen |language=ko |via=Naver}}</ref>

On July 22, 2021, Ailee joined The L1ve as their first official artist.

On October 14, 2021, it was announced that Ailee will be releasing her third studio album Amy on October 27, with the lead single "Don't Teach Me".

On March 7, 2022, Ailee released her English studio album I'm Lovin' Amy.

In July 2022, it was announced that Ailee's contract with The L1ve would expire later that month.

On November 3, 2022, Pop Music (A2G Entertainment) announced that the '2022 Ailee National Tour Concert 'One Step More', scheduled to take place on the 5th and 6th, has been postponed to January 28 and 29, 2023 on the aftermath of the Seoul Halloween crowd crush.

Awards and nominations

Discography

Korean albums
 Vivid (2015)
 Butterfly (2019)
 Amy (2021)

English albums
 I'm Lovin' Amy (2022)

Filmography

Television drama

Television shows

Web shows

 Tours and concerts 

Welcome Home Tour

Welcome Home Tour was the first nationwide tour by Ailee, in support of her fourth extended play A New Empire. The tour visited six cities through 2016 and 2017.

Set list

Tour dates

I AM: Ailee Tour

I AM: Ailee Tour was the second nationwide tour by Ailee. The tour visited four cities in South Korea, starting on December 8, 2018.

I AM: Re-born Tour

I AM: Reborn Tour was the third nationwide tour by Ailee. The first leg of the tour visited seven cities in South Korea, starting on December 7, 2019.

Show Tok

Show Tok was the fourth nationwide tour by Ailee. The first leg of the tour visited seven cities in South Korea, starting on May 1, 2021.

Solo concerts

Co-headlining tours and concerts
 2014: Winter Concert with Eric Benet
 2014: Someday Concert with Wheesung
 2015: Unite the Mic Tour with Jay Park and San E
 2015: Back to School Concert with Wheesung
 2016: Come Here! Concert with Yoon Min-soo
 2017: Superstage Concert with Brian McKnight and Zion.T
 2018: Best of Best Concert in Taipei with Taeyeon and Taemin
 2018: Concert'' with Dynamic Duo

References

External links

 Official YMC Entertainment website
 Official Warner Music Japan website

 
1989 births
Living people
American women pop singers
American women singer-songwriters
American musicians of Korean descent
American people of South Korean descent
American sopranos
Japanese-language singers of the United States
Spanish-language singers of the United States
Korean-language singers of the United States
American K-pop singers
Singer-songwriters from New Jersey
Pace University alumni
People from Leonia, New Jersey
Scotch Plains-Fanwood High School alumni
Singers from Denver
MAMA Award winners
Warner Music Japan artists
Melon Music Award winners
21st-century American women singers
21st-century American singers
Singer-songwriters from Colorado
American expatriates in South Korea